Charqueadas is a municipality in the state of Rio Grande do Sul, Brazil. It is located on the southern side of the Jacuí River, in the eastern-central part of the state. It borders to the south Arroio dos Ratos, to the north Triunfo, to the east Eldorado do Sul and to the west São Jerônimo.

See also
List of municipalities in Rio Grande do Sul

References

Municipalities in Rio Grande do Sul